Sherwood Forest is a royal forest in Nottinghamshire, England, famous by its historical association with the legend of Robin Hood.

Sherwood Forest may also refer to:

Places
Neighborhoods
Sherwood Forest, Atlanta
Sherwood Forest, Detroit
Sherwood Forest (Charlotte neighborhood), Charlotte, North Carolina
Sherwood Forest, Los Angeles

Unincorporated communities
Sherwood Forest, Anne Arundel County, Maryland
Sherwood Forest, Frederick County, Maryland
Sherwood Forest, Montgomery County, Maryland
Sherwood Forest, Worcester County, Maryland
Sherwood Forest, Virginia

Other places
Sherwood Forest, Massachusetts
Sherwood Forest Plantation, a plantation in Virginia owned by two US presidents

Other uses
Sherwood Forest (horse), a New Zealand racehorse
Sherwood Forest Bridge, in Saskatchewan, Canada
Sherwood Forest Railway, a miniature railway in England

See also
Sherwood Foresters, an infantry regiment of the British Army